This is a list of Permanent Representatives of Guyana to the United Nations.

 Sir John Carter; 21 September 1966
 E. R. Braithwaite; 4 January 1967
 Aloysius Paterson Thompson; 19 August 1969
 Frederick Hilborn Talbot; 19 July 1971
 Rashleigh Esmond Jackson; 30 January 1973
 Noel G. Sinclair; 7 March 1979
 Samuel Rudolph Insanally; 18 February 1987
 Rudolph Michael Ten-Pow; 22 August 2016
 Carolyn Rodrigues-Birkett; 2020

References

External links 
  Permanent Mission of Guyana to the United Nations

 
Guyana
United Nations